
Gmina Kozłowo is a rural gmina (administrative district) in Nidzica County, Warmian-Masurian Voivodeship, in northern Poland.

Villages
Gmina Kozłowo contains the villages and settlements of Bartki, Browina, Cebulki, Dziurdziewo, Górowo, Kozłowo, Krokowo, Michałki, Niedanowo, Pielgrzymowo, Rogóż, Sarnowo, Siemianowo, Sławka Mała, Sławka Wielka, Szkotowo, Szkudaj, Szymany, Turówko, Turowo, Ważyny, Wierzbowo, Wola, Zabłocie Kozłowskie, Zaborowo, Zakrzewko, Zakrzewo and Zalesie.

Neighbouring gminas
Gmina Kozłowo is bordered by the gminas of Dąbrówno, Działdowo, Grunwald, Iłowo-Osada, Janowiec Kościelny, Nidzica and Olsztynek.

References
Polish official population figures 2006

Kozlowo
Nidzica County